Pipoxizine is a first-generation antihistamine as well as serotonin antagonist of the diphenylmethylpiperazine group related to hydroxyzine. It was investigated as a bronchodilator but was never marketed.

References

Primary alcohols
Bronchodilators
Ethers
H1 receptor antagonists
Benzhydryl compounds
Piperazines
Serotonin receptor antagonists